Risto Apostolov (Cyrillic:Ристо Апостолов) is Macedonian songwriter, composer, and music producer. He is also guitarist, singer, and leader of rock band Vodolija.

As a composer and performer with his band Vodolija he participated at the Macedonian Eurovision Song Contest 2009 with the song (Mojot TV),
Macedonian Eurovision Song Contest 2010 with the song (Solza), Macedonian Eurovision Song Contest 2011 with the song (Ne vrakaj se). He is also a producer and arranger of Rok Agresori song (Ding Dong) which was performed on the Macedonian Eurovision Song Contest 2009.

He has realized three studio albums with his band Vodolija. The first two albums are recorded in the studio of Vladimir Petrovski-Karter from Badmingtons. The third album was recorded in his own studio

In June 2010, with his band Vodolija, he held acoustic concert on Macedonian Public Television MTV. The concert was broadcast in October 2010.

In 2008/2009 he recorded duets with Sonia Sauruk from New Jersey for the songs (Best of your love) and (Summertime). Summertime is on the third album of Vodolija. In November 2011, he received the prize for best production for the song of Vodolija (Ti ne si)

In 2012, with his band Vodolija, he represented Macedonia on INFE VISION network contest organised by (International Network of Fanclubs of Eurovision (I.N.F.E.) with song Mojot TV

In August 2013, with his band Vodolija, he participated in the Ohrid Fest festival with the song (Radost i bol) in Pop and International night of festival. He is also composer that song.

He also composes music and makes arrangements for other artists and solo singers.

In 2015 as a Guest star, he starred in the film "Where is the money" and his song (Se sto mi treba) is part of the movie soundtrack.

Discography
Singles with Vodolija
Strast - 2022 
Polna so magija - 2020
Samo eden - 2019
Ljubovna pesna - 2017
Koga i kako - 2016
Odam napred - 2015
Se sto mi treba - 2015
Kako od bajki - 2015
Radost i bol - 2013
Ne vrakaj se - 2011
Solza - 2010
Mojot TV - 2009
Sekavanja - 2008
Ti ne si - 2007
Izmislen od Bajki - 2006

Albums with Vodolija
Se sto e sveto -2009/2010 - CD
Hazard - 1997/1998 - Cassette/CD
Ljubov ili Strasti - 1996-Cassette

References
Страст 
„Водолија“ со сета сласт се’ уште ви ја нуди старата добра рок ен рол -„Страст“ (ЛИРИК ВИДЕО)
“Страст” е нешто ново од “Водолија” 
„Полна со магија“ е новиот сингл на Водолија! 
„Водолија“ потсетува дека овој живот е – „Само еден“ (ВИДЕО) 
„Само еден“ нова песна на „Водолија“
„Водолија“ има нова „Љубовна песна“ 
Рок-групата „Водолија“ го објави спотот за новата „Љубовна песна“ (ВИДЕО) 
Водолија – „Кога и како“ (ВИДЕО) 
„Водолија“ прашуваат „Кога и како?“
ВИДЕО: Водолија се’ уште „оди напред“! 
Сè што ви треба е „Сè што ми треба“ од Водолија
Групата „Водолија“ со нова песна и спот
MRT publishes final song list
Artists and composers announced
Водолија сними песна со Sonia Souruk
Summertime како најава за новото CD на Водолија
Водолија кани на акустичен концерт
Коментарите ги оставам откако ќе заврши Изборот...
Second semi final Skopje Fest 2010
National semi-final entries announced
Водолија News
Водолија сними спот за Солза
Го видовте ли спотот на Водолија за темата Мојот ТВ?
СЕ ШТО Е СВЕТО НА ВОДОЛИЈА НА ПРОМОЦИЈА
Рок-групата „Водолија“ кани на акустичен концерт
„Сеќавања“ - нов сингл на „Водолија“
Get to know the Skopje Fest 2010 performers
Macedonia in the Eurovision Song Contest 2010
Macedonia in the Eurovision Song Contest 2011
Macedonia in the Eurovision Song Contest 2009
Risto Apostolov so nagrada za produkcija
INFE VISION 2012
Водолија на Infe Vision 2012

Musicians from Skopje
Macedonian male songwriters
Macedonian record producers
21st-century Macedonian male singers
Living people
Year of birth missing (living people)